Inositol-trisphosphate 3-kinase B is an enzyme that in humans is encoded by the ITPKB gene.

Function 

The protein encoded by the ITPKB gene is one of 3 isoforms of Inositol-trisphosphate 3-kinase expressed in humans. ITPKB protein regulates inositol phosphate metabolism by phosphorylation of second messenger inositol 1,4,5-trisphosphate, which releases calcium from intracellular store in the endoplasmic reticulum by gating the inositol trisphosphate receptor. ITPKB produces Ins(1,3,4,5)P4, which does not gate the inositol trisphosphate receptor. The enzyme specifically phosphorylates the 1,4,5 isomer of IP3. The activity of this encoded protein is responsible for regulating the levels of a large number of inositol polyphosphates that are important in cellular signaling. Both calcium/calmodulin and protein phosphorylation mechanisms control its activity.  Itpkb regulates immune cell function and is required for T and B cell development.

References

Further reading